Rein Rannap (born 6 October 1953 in Tallinn) is an Estonian composer and pianist.

Since 1968, Rannap has given numerous public piano performances.

Rannap has been active in management and composition for Ruja, Noor-Eesti and Hõim.

Pianist career 
Rannap gave his first solo concert in 1968.  Since that time, he has performed piano concerts in many regions of the (former) Soviet Union, a number of European countries, as well as Australia and United States. In 1997 and 1999, he toured Estonia under the Klaver tuleb külla (Estonian for The Piano Comes to Visit) programme, transporting his piano to various churches in Estonia for the performances.

Piano pieces and cycles 

"Naive and innocent Tracks" (1980–1982)
"Piano Concerto" (1984)
"Cruise Control" (1991)
"Six-pack piano" (1997)
"Laulud klaveril" (2010)
"Sõrmepalavik" (2011)

Discography 

 "Varajased laulud" (2002)
 "Tantsib klaveril" (2004)
 "Läbi jäätunud klaasi" (2006)
 "Klaver tuleb külla 10 - parimad palad" (2007)
 "KlaveriKuld" (2009)
 "Ilus maa" (2009)
 "Hingelinnud" (2011)

Miscellania 
In 2007, Rannap was chosen as one of the three jury members of Eesti otsib superstaari, an Estonian remake of the British Pop Idol format.

Sources
Brief biography at the Estonian Music Information Centre

External links

1953 births
Living people
Musicians from Tallinn
Estonian pianists
Tallinn Music High School alumni
Estonian Academy of Music and Theatre alumni
20th-century Estonian musicians
21st-century Estonian musicians
20th-century Estonian composers
21st-century Estonian composers
21st-century pianists
Recipients of the Order of the White Star, 4th Class